Munchirai is a block or Panchayat Union of Kanyakumari district, India. It is one among the nine administrative divisions of the district of Kanyakumari. It is famous for the famous Sivalaya Ottam as its starting point. The present President of the Munchirai Panchayat is C.Rajeswari
. It includes the following 11 Village Panchayats:

 Adaikkakuzhi
 Choozhal
 Kulappuram
 Mankad
 Munchirai
 Nadaikavu
 Thoothoor
 Vavarai
 Vilathurai
 Painkulam
 Methukummal

References
 Official Web Portal of Kanyakumari District

Cities and towns in Kanyakumari district